The 1950–51 Hovedserien was the 7th completed season of top division football in Norway.

Overview
It was contested by 16 teams, and Fredrikstad FK won the championship.

Teams and locations
Note: Table lists in alphabetical order.

League tables

Group A

Group B

Results

Group A

Group B

Championship final
Odd 1–3 Fredrikstad FK
Fredrikstad FK 4–2 Odd

Fredrikstad won 7–2 on aggregate.

References
Norway – List of final tables (RSSSF)

Eliteserien seasons
Norway
1
1